Michael Andreas Kreevich (June 10, 1908 – April 25, 1994) was an American professional baseball player. He batted and threw right-handed.

Early life
Kreevich was born in Mount Olive, Illinois. He started working in coal mines in late 1924 at the age of 16. Although short of stature (five feet and seven and a half inches tall), he developed a muscular physique while coal mining for almost five years. With the Great Depression, the coal mines closed in 1930. It was about this time that he was invited to play for a team in McCook, Nebraska. Kreevich soon went from that small town team to the National League's Chicago Cubs, thanks to a scout who recognized the talent in him.

Career
In , he joined the cross-town Chicago White Sox, but did not become a regular until . In  he led the American League in triples and sacrifice flies while batting .302, and finishing 10th in the American League MVP Award voting. In , he again finished 10th in the American League MVP Award voting, while batting .323.

After the  season, Kreevich was traded to the Philadelphia Athletics. He was released after only one season, and signed with the St. Louis Browns before the  campaign. While with the Browns he played in the all-St. Louis 1944 World Series against the Cardinals. In the middle of the  season, he was purchased by the Washington Senators; he finished his career after that season in the nation's capital.

In 1,241 games played over 12 seasons, Kreevich compiled a .283 batting average (1321-4676) with 676 runs, 221 doubles, 75 triples, 45 home runs, 514 RBIs, 115 stolen bases, 446 bases on balls, .346 on-base percentage and a .391 slugging percentage. His career fielding percentage was .981.

See also
 List of Major League Baseball annual triples leaders

References

1908 births
1994 deaths
American League All-Stars
Major League Baseball outfielders
Baseball players from Illinois
Chicago Cubs players
Chicago White Sox players
Philadelphia Athletics players
St. Louis Browns players
Washington Senators (1901–1960) players
People from Mount Olive, Illinois
McCook Generals players
Des Moines Demons players
Kansas City Blues (baseball) players
Los Angeles Angels (minor league) players